"Catch the Rainbow" is the twenty-first single by Japanese recording artist Misia.

Background 
The song "Catch the Rainbow" was first released digitally Asia-wide on August 30, 2008. It was later released as a physical CD single on December 17, 2008. "Catch the Rainbow" is Misia's only non-album single. It was released in support of Misia's first Asia tour The Tour of Misia Discotheque Asia. The first press edition of the single comes in Super High Material CD (SHM-CD) format and includes a bonus DVD, which features footage from The Tour of Misia Discotheque Asia, as well as the "Catch the Rainbow" music video.

"Catch the Rainbow" was written by Misia, while the composition and production were handled by long-time collaborator Sakoshin. The B-side, "Joyful Moment", was also written by Misia, composed by Gomi and Shusui and produced by Gomi. The single includes six remixes of different genres including electropop, hip hop and house.

Chart performance 
"Catch the Rainbow" debuted on the Oricon Daily Singles chart at number 6 and peaked at number 11 on the Oricon Weekly Singles chart, with 7,271 copies sold in its first week. The single charted for seven weeks and sold 12,150 copies in total.

Track listing

Charts

Release history

References 

2008 singles
Misia songs
Songs written by Misia